Top Deck may refer to:

Top Deck (drink), a defunct brand of carbonated soft drink sold in the United Kingdom.
Top Deck (horse) an American Thoroughbred stallion born in 1945
Top Deck (magazine), a defunct gaming magazine published by Wizards of the Coast.
Topdeck Travel, a tour company with origins in double decker bus trails
Top Deck (Clan), one of the best clans on a game called GunZ
Dairy Milk Top Deck, a chocolate bar sold in Australia, New Zealand and South Africa by Cadbury products